Matei Alexe Călinescu  (June 15, 1934 – June 24, 2009) was a Romanian literary critic and professor of comparative literature at Indiana University, in Bloomington, Indiana.

Biography
Călinescu was born in Bucharest, Romania, the son of Radu Călinescu, an engineer, and Dora Călinescu (née Vulcănescu), a homemaker. He then pursued his studies at the University of Bucharest, graduating in 1957. He was offered a Fulbright grant and defected to the United States in 1973.

From 1973 to 1975 Călinescu was a visiting professor at Indiana University Bloomington, before becoming an associate professor there in 1976, and a full professor in 1978. He was awarded a Guggenheim Fellowship in 1975. He became a naturalized American citizen in 1980. Upon his retirement he became an Emeritus Professor at Indiana University. He lived with his wife in Bloomington, Indiana, and died there in 2009.

Selected bibliography
 Matei Călinescu, Matthew's Enigma: A father's portrait of his autistic son., Bloomington, IN: Indiana University Press, 2009, 210 p. 
 Matei Călinescu, Eugène Ionesco: Teme identitare și existențiale (Eugène Ionesco: Identity and Existential Themes) Iași: Junimea, 2006, 491 p.
 Matei Călinescu, Ionesco: Recherches identitaires, Paris: Oxus, 2005, 348 p.
 Matei Călinescu, Un fel de jurnal, 1973–1981 (A Diary of Sorts, 1973–1981), Iași: Polirom, 2005.
 Matei Călinescu, Ion Vianu, Amintiri în dialog (Memories in Dialogue), Bucharest: Editura Litera, 1994; 2nd ed. with preface and two new chapters included as an Epilogue, Iași: Polirom, 1998; 3rd edition, Iași: Polirom, 2005.
 Matei Călinescu, Tu: Elegii și invenții (You: Elegies and Inventions, poems), Iași: Polirom, 2004.
 Matei Călinescu, Mateiu I. Caragiale: recitiri, Cluj: Biblioteca Apostrof, 2003, 160 p., 2nd ed., Cluj-Iași: Apostrof-Polirom, 2007.
 Matei Călinescu, Portretul lui M (The Portrait of M, a memoir), Iași: Polirom, 2003.
 Matei Călinescu, Rereading, New Haven: Yale University Press, 1993, 336 p. Translated into Romanian as A citi, a reciti. Cǎtre o poeticǎ a (re)lecturii, Iași: Polirom, 2003. 
 Matei Călinescu, Despre Ioan P. Culianu și Mircea Eliade. Amintiri, Lecturi, Reflecții, Iași: Polirom, 2002, 177 p., 2nd ed., Iași: Polirom, 2002, 231 p.
 Vlad Georgescu, Matei Călinescu, The Romanians: a history, Ohio State University Press, 1991. 
 Matei Călinescu, Exploring Postmodernism, (co-edited with Douwe W. Fokkema), Amsterdam and Philadelphia: John Benjamins, 1988, 270 p., Paperback edition, 1990.
 Matei Călinescu, Five Faces of Modernity: Modernism, Avant-Garde, Decadence, Kitsch, Postmodernism, Duke University Press, 1987. 
 Matei Călinescu, Faces of Modernity: Avant-Garde, Decadence, Kitsch, Indiana University Press, 1977.   
 Matei Călinescu, Selections of Poetry translated into English in Mundus Artium, 1976; New Letters, 1976; Seneca Review, 1981; Correspondences, 1982; and 2 PLUS 2, 1983.
 Matei Călinescu, Umbre de apă, poeme, (Water Shadows, poems), Bucharest: Editura Cartea Românească, 1972.
 Matei Călinescu, Versuri (Lines), Bucharest: Editura Eminescu, 1970.
 Matei Călinescu, Viața și opiniile lui Zacharias Lichter (The Life  and Opinions of Zacharias Lichter), a short novel, Bucharest: Editura Pentru Literatură, 1969. Translated into Hungarian, 1971; Polish, 1972; French excerpts, in Cahiers de l'Est, 1, 2, 1975; and English, 2018. 2nd  ed., enlarged, Bucharest: Editura Eminescu, 1971;  3rd ed., with new preface, 1995, Iași: Polirom, 1995; 4th edition, Iași: Polirom, 2004.

Awards
 1969: Romanian Writers' Union Prize for Fiction, for Viaţa şi opiniile lui Zacharias Lichter (The Life and Opinions of Zacharias Lichter)
 1975: Guggenheim Fellowship
 2006: Writers' Union Prize for Essay and Criticism, for Eugène Ionesco: Teme identitare și existențiale (Eugène Ionesco: Identity and Existential Themes)

References

External links
 "Matei Calinescu", at Indiana University
 "Matei Calinescu", at WordsWithoutBorders
 Author’s page on the website of Romanian publishing house Polirom

1934 births
2009 deaths
Romanian emigrants to the United States
Romanian defectors
Indiana University faculty
Romanian literary historians
Romanian literary critics
Romanian diarists
Deaths from lung cancer
Deaths from cancer in Indiana
Writers from Bucharest
University of Bucharest alumni
Academic staff of the University of Bucharest
20th-century diarists